John F. "Denny" Driscoll (November 19, 1855 – July 11, 1886) was an American Major League Baseball pitcher from 1880 to 1884. Driscoll played for the Buffalo Bisons, Pittsburgh Alleghenys (the modern-day Pittsburgh Pirates), and Louisville Eclipse. While playing for Pittsburgh, he led the American Association in earned run average in 1882, at 1.21. He went 13-9 that season. In 1883, he was the primary pitcher for the Alleghenys' for most of the season with an 18–21 record, and was the opening day starting pitcher.

Personal life
Driscoll was playing baseball professionally for local teams in Lowell and Nashua, New Hampshire by the age of 15. In November, 1882, he married 18-year old Mary Driscoll of Westford, Massachusetts.  Soon afterwards he moved to Westford, most likely in the village of Graniteville, as the Casey family members were employed in the local granite quarries and mills. After the death of his father-in-law, Driscoll supported the Casey family with his baseball salary.  In vital records of the early 1880s, he alternately listed his occupation as 'ball player' or 'machinist'. Denny Driscoll had two children with Mary, John William, born September 17, 1883, and Lizzie, born April 21, 1885.
Driscoll died in his hometown of Lowell, Massachusetts at the age of 30 of consumption (tuberculosis). He is interred at St. Patrick Cemetery.

References

External links

1855 births
1886 deaths
19th-century baseball players
Baseball players from Massachusetts
Major League Baseball pitchers
Buffalo Bisons (NL) players
Pittsburgh Alleghenys players
Louisville Colonels players
Sportspeople from Lowell, Massachusetts
19th-century deaths from tuberculosis
Albany (minor league baseball) players
New York Metropolitans (minor league) players
Philadelphia Athletics (minor league) players
Brooklyn Atlantics (minor league) players
Newark Domestics players
Binghamton Crickets (1880s) players
Tuberculosis deaths in Massachusetts